Deerhurst is an unincorporated community in New Castle County, Delaware, United States. Deerhurst is located between U.S. Route 202, Delaware Route 261, and Murphy Road near Fairfax.

Notable people
John J. Brady, a Delaware Sports Museum and Hall of Fame coach and sportswriter, lived in Deerhurst

References 

Unincorporated communities in New Castle County, Delaware
Unincorporated communities in Delaware